Longitarsus luridus is a species of beetle from the Chrysomelidae family that can be found everywhere in Europe (except Portugal).

References

luridus
Beetles described in 1763
Beetles of Asia
Taxa named by Giovanni Antonio Scopoli